Unnati Davara is an Indian beauty pageant contestant, model and actress. In 2010 she won Femina Miss India East title.

Biography 
Davara started her career with Femina Miss India 2010, Davara won Femina Miss India East title and became one of the top 10 finalists. During the pageant she also won two sub-titles; Miss Vivacious and Miss Talented.

In 2012 she debuted in acting with a Bengali film named Teen Kanya. The film was directed by Agnidev Chatterjee.

Filmography

Television

Awards 
 2010: Pantaloons Femina Miss India East

References

External links
 

Living people
Female models from Chhattisgarh
Actresses in Bengali cinema
Indian beauty pageant winners
Indian film actresses
21st-century Indian actresses
Actresses from Chhattisgarh
People from Raipur, Chhattisgarh
Year of birth missing (living people)